John Samuel "Sam"  Trabucco is an American business executive. He was the former co-CEO of Alameda Research, a quantitative trading firm founded by Sam Bankman-Fried. He was the co-CEO of the firm along with Caroline Ellison until August 2022 when he stepped down from the role of CEO. According to anonymous sources cited by The Wall Street Journal, in November 2022 Sam Bankman-Fried said that Alameda Research owed $10 billion to cryptocurrency exchange FTX. These sources said that FTX had lent the trading firm money from customer funds at FTX. He also writes crossword puzzles for The New York Times.

Early life and education 
Trabucco attended a Mount Holyoke College math camp in 2010 where he met Sam Bankman-Fried. Trabucco received his bachelor’s in mathematics and computer science from Massachusetts Institute of Technology (MIT). There he also served as president of the undergrad math association and reconnected with Bankman-Fried.

Career 
After graduation, he worked for Susquehanna International Group, a quantitative trading firm. He joined Alameda Research in March 2019, and officially became the co-CEO in October 2021 along with Caroline Ellison. The following August, Trabucco stepped down from the role and Caroline Ellison became the sole CEO of the firm.

Recognition
 2022: Named in Forbes 30 Under 30 - North America - Finance

References 

Year of birth missing (living people)
Living people
Chief executive officers
People associated with cryptocurrency
Massachusetts Institute of Technology School of Science alumni
Massachusetts Institute of Technology people
American expatriates in the Bahamas